Czajków  is a village in Ostrzeszów County, Greater Poland Voivodeship, in west-central Poland. It is the seat of the gmina (administrative district) called Gmina Czajków.

The village has a population of 1,100.

References

Villages in Ostrzeszów County